List of Miller Research Fellows:

This list is incomplete: Only those in mathematics are included so far. There are Miller Fellows in all basic sciences, for example also in Astronomy, Physics, and Chemistry. There is a complete list at the Miller Institute web page.

Mathematics

References 

 Mathematics Genealogy Project
  The Miller Institute web page

Miller Research Fellows
University of California, Berkeley people
!Miller Research
Miller